"All the Way My Savior Leads Me" is a Christian hymn with lyrics written in 1875 by Fanny J. Crosby (1820-1915) to a tune written by the Baptist minister Dr. Robert Lowry.

History
In her autobiography, Crosby wrote that this was her first hymn to be set to music by Lowry.  The hymn was first published in Brightest and best : a choice collection of new songs, duets, choruses, invocation and benediction hymns for the Sunday school and meetings of prayer and praise (edited by Dr. Lowry and W. Howard Doane) in 1875 by the New York publisher Biglow & Main.   The syllabic meter is 8.7.8.7.D.

A frequently told story about this hymn relates that it came to Fanny as a result of a prayer.  Struggling financially, she desperately needed some money.  As her usual custom, Fanny began to pray.  A few minutes later, a gentleman offered her five dollars, the exact amount she needed.  Later recalling the incident, she said, "I have no way of accounting for this except to believe that God put it into the heart of this good man to bring the money."  The poem she wrote afterward became "All The Way My Savior Leads Me".

Popularity
The song is considered one of Crosby's best known hymns.  It has been included in over 250 hymnals, including a quarter of those produced since 1970.

References

External links
Free Piano MP3 version of All The Way My Savior Leads Me
History, Lyrics, MIDI file at the Cyber Hymnal
Brightest and best

American Christian hymns
Hymns by Fanny Crosby
Gospel songs
Songs with lyrics by Fanny Crosby
1875 songs
1875 in Christianity
19th-century hymns
Songs about Jesus
Hymns by Robert Lowry